Stradbroke High School is a secondary school with academy status for 11- to 16-year-olds in the village of Stradbroke in the English county of Suffolk. Founded in 1953 as a secondary modern school on the edge of the village, Stradbroke High School serves a catchment covering almost  including the parishes of Athelington & Horham, Fressingfield, Laxfield, Mendham, Wilby, Worlingworth, and Cratfield. As of 2006, this represents a catchment population of some 7,500 people. It has around 300 pupils.

The school is small and therefore able to know and support each pupil individually.  In 2018 the school's GCSE students attained the second highest results in Suffolk and Norfolk.

The school's best-known alumni are television journalist Amelia Reynolds and These Animal Men vocalist and lead guitarist Alexander (previously Roger) Boag.

Akeem >>

Secondary schools in Suffolk
Academies in Suffolk
1953 establishments in England
Educational institutions established in 1953
Stradbroke